Checking Out is a 2005 American comedy film directed by Jeff Hare and written by Richard Marcus, based on the play of the same name by Allen Swift. It stars Peter Falk, Laura San Giacomo, David Paymer and Judge Reinhold.

Plot 
Morris Applebaum, an eccentric, celebrated stage actor of Jewish origin summons by letters his three adult children to his Manhattan apartment for the celebration of his 90th birthday and a special event they'll never forget; when the party's over, Morris plans to take his "final exit". He is healthy and not unduly depressed although he's missing his wife, but he just wants to go out the way he's lived, on his own terms and as a performance. Now it's up to his hilarious offspring – Flo, Ted, Barry and his daughter-in-law and her teen son and daughter – to put aside their own excessive baggage from childhood and convince Morris that he touched many people and changed their lives. But Morris escapes from his apartment by hiring a taxi cab and, assisted by the NYC geriatric psychiatrists Dr. Sheldon Henning, the adventure begins.

Сast 

 Peter Falk as Morris Applebaum
 Laura San Giacomo as Flo Applebaum
 David Paymer as Ted Applebaum
 Judge Reinhold as Barry Apple
 Jeffrey D. Sams as Dr. Sheldon Henning
 Shera Danese as Rhonda Apple
 Mary Elizabeth Winstead as Lisa Apple
 Dan Byrd as Jason Apple
 Tony Todd as Manuel
 Alex Datcher as Raphaella
 David Bowe as Allen
 Bob Bancroft as Foyt
 Luis Antonio Ramos as Luis
 Galen Yuen as Foreman
 Joey Gray as Dan
 Anthony Giangrande as Aaron
 Philippe Bergeron as Driver
 Jordana Capra as Woman Customer
 Megahn Perry as Sitcom Woman
 Michael Bavone as Nurse
 Jasmine Jessica Anthony as Young Flo Applebaum (uncredited)
 Tara Lynne Barr as Ballet Student (uncredited)
 Gavin MacLeod as Doorman (uncredited)

Reception 
On review aggregator Rotten Tomatoes, the film holds a rating of 38%, based on 8 reviews. On Metacritic, the film has a weighted average score of 44 out of 100, based on 5 critics, indicating "mixed or average reviews".

References

External links 
 

2005 films
2005 comedy films
American comedy films
Films about actors
Films about old age
Films about suicide
Films set in New York City
Films shot in New York City
Films directed by Jeff Hare
Films scored by Nicholas Pike
2000s English-language films
2000s American films